The Curtis Institute of Music is a private conservatory in Philadelphia. It offers a performance diploma, Bachelor of Music, Master of Music in opera, and a Professional Studies Certificate in opera. All students attend on full scholarship.

History

The Curtis Institute of Music was founded in 1924 by Mary Louise Curtis Bok. She named the new school for her father, publishing magnate Cyrus Curtis. Early faculty at the institute included conductor Leopold Stokowski and the pianist Josef Hofmann.

The institute has not charged tuition since 1928; it provides full scholarship to all admitted students.

In 2020, following credible allegations of abuse at the hands of past faculty, the school ended its practice of keeping students enrolled "at the discretion of their major instrument teacher". In accepting the findings of an independent investigation of abuse allegations that found the practice was a "real threat" a student "could be dismissed for any reason at any time", Curtis pledged several other steps to ensure students' well-being, including providing them with access to counseling.

Admission
The institute formerly served as a training ground for orchestral musicians to fill the ranks of the Philadelphia Orchestra, although composers, organists, pianists, guitarists, and singers are offered courses of study as well.

With the exception of composers, conductors, pianists, organists, and guitarists, admission is granted only to the number of students to fill a single orchestra and opera company. Accordingly, enrollment is in the range of 150 to 175 students. According to statistics compiled by U.S. News & World Report, the institute has the lowest acceptance rate of any college or university (4 percent), making it among the most selective institutions of higher education in the United States.

Nina Simone claimed her application for a scholarship was rejected because of her race, despite excellent credentials and audition performance. Simone was one of 75 pianists to audition in 1951; only three were accepted. A short while before her death, Simone was awarded an honorary diploma by Curtis.

Notable faculty 

Eleanor Sokoloff was a piano teacher at the institute, beginning during her studies in 1936, and serving until her death in 2020.

Penelope P. Watkins Ensemble in Residence
The Dover Quartet is the Penelope P. Watkins Ensemble in Residence at Curtis. Their faculty residency integrates teaching and mentorship, and the resident ensemble will recruit promising young string quartets to nurture a new generation of professional chamber ensembles.

Campus

Gould Rehearsal Hall
Gould Rehearsal Hall A 2,850-square-foot, acoustically designed rehearsal hall accommodates a full orchestra, with state-of-the-art video and audio capabilities.

Field Concert Hall
Field Concert Hall, a 240-seat auditorium with splendid acoustics and facilities for video- and audio-recording, is used for weekly student recitals, faculty and alumni concerts, master classes, and recording sessions. It also houses a 5-manual, 116-rank Aeolian-Skinner organ.

Rock Resource Center
The Rock Resource Center of the Curtis Institute of Music contains more than 100,000 music scores, books, and recordings for study and performance. Comprising the John de Lancie Library and the Curtis Archives, the Rock Resource Center’s mission is to: provide Curtis students, faculty, and staff with the best possible collection of printed music, books, periodicals, recordings, and electronic resources needed to fulfill the school's mission; promote the Rock Resource Center's holdings through forward thinking and open patron service; and preserve and make Curtis’s past accessible to the greater Curtis community. The Curtis Archives comprises largely unpublished materials whose value derives from its collection by, ownership of, or relation to, a Curtis-affiliated individual. Non-Curtis collections of published and unpublished materials, as well as published materials by anyone (Curtis-related or not), can be found in Special Collections. Official Curtis recordings are a part of the library collection.

Notable people

Alumni

Many alumni of the Curtis Institute have gone on to distinguished careers including:

A–L

 Teddy Abrams, Music Director of the Louisville Orchestra
 James Adler, composer
 Milton Adolphus, composer, arranger, pianist
 Joseph Alessi, principal trombonist of the New York Philharmonic
 Adrian Anantawan, violinist
 Reid Anderson, bassist of The Bad Plus
 Shmuel Ashkenasi, first violinist of the Vermeer Quartet
 Jenny Oaks Baker, first violinist of the National Symphony Orchestra
 Rose Bampton, principal singer at the Metropolitan Opera during the 1930s and 1940s
 Samuel Barber, composer
 Michael Alden Bayard, percussionist and founder/owner of Rhythm Magic
 Diane Meredith Belcher, organist
 Leonard Bernstein, composer and conductor
 Jonathan Biss, pianist
 Judith Blegen, soprano
 Natalie Bodanya, opera singer
 Jorge Bolet, pianist and erstwhile Head of Piano at the Curtis Institute
 Gwendolyn Bradley, opera singer
 David Brooks, Broadway actor, stage director and producer
 Yefim Bronfman, piano
 Anshel Brusilow, violinist, conductor
 Alyson Cambridge (born 1980), operatic soprano and classical music, jazz, and American popular song singer
 Karina Canellakis, conductor
 Jenny Q. Chai, piano
 Keith Chapman, concert organist
 Ray Chen, violinist
 Cheng Wai, pianist
 Shura Cherkassky, pianist
 Pearl Chertok, harpist and composer
 Young-Chang Cho, cellist
 Jasmine Choi, flutist
 Nicolas Chumachenco, violinist
 Katherine Ciesinski, mezzo-soprano
 Layla Claire, soprano
 Tim Cobb, current principal bassist with the Metropolitan Opera
 Vinson Cole, operatic tenor
 Ken Cowan, organist, assistant professor of organ at the Westminster Choir College (Rice University)
 John Dalley, violinist, Oberlin String Quartet 1957–59, one of four founding members of Guarneri Quartet 1964–2009; faculty
 Di Wu, pianist
 John de Lancie, principal oboe of the Philadelphia Orchestra, faculty at Curtis and Director of the school 1977–85 
 Joseph de Pasquale, violist, faculty at Curtis 1964-2015 
 Stanley Drucker, principal clarinetist of the New York Philharmonic
 Julius Eastman, pianist, conductor, singer, composer
 Mohammed Fairouz, composer
 Juan Diego Flórez, tenor
 Lukas Foss, composer, conductor and pianist
 Bianca Garcia, flute, politician
 Frank Guarrera, baritone
 Anthony Gigliotti, clarinetist, former principal of the Philadelphia Orchestra
 Alan Gilbert, conductor, music director of the New York Philharmonic
 Max Goberman, conductor
 Richard Goode, pianist
 Valerie Muzzolini Gordon, harpist, principal of the Seattle Symphony Orchestra
 Olga Gorelli, composer and pianist
 Daron Hagen, composer, conductor, pianist, and stage director
 Hilary Hahn, violinist
 Burt Hara, clarinetist, principal of the Minnesota Orchestra
 Lynn Harrell, cello soloist
 Margaret Rosezarian Harris, conductor
 Margaret Harshaw, opera singer
 David Hayes, Music Director of The Philadelphia Singers and Director of Orchestral and Conducting Studies at Mannes College The New School for Music
 Daniel Heifetz, violinist; founder of the Heifetz International Music Institute
 Michael Hennagin, composer
 Shuler Hensley, singer and actor
 Sarah Hicks, conductor
 Jennifer Higdon, composer
 Lee Hoiby, composer
 Stanley Hollingsworth, composer
 David Horne, composer and pianist
 Michael Houstoun (born 1952), concert pianist
 Claire Huangci, pianist
 Eugene Istomin, pianist
 David N. Johnson, composer, organist and professor
 Arnold Jacobs, former tubist of the Chicago Symphony Orchestra and teacher of brass pedagogy (deceased)
 Paul Jacobs, organist, organ professor at the Juilliard School
 Paavo Järvi (conductor), Cincinnati Symphony Orchestra previously, Deutchekammerphilharmonie Bremen
 Leila Josefowicz, violinist
 Judy Kang, violinist
 Leonard Kastle, composer, screenwriter, and film director
 Sean Kennard, pianist
  Nina Kennedy, pianist, conductor, and filmmaker
 Chin Kim, violinist, soloist, faculty at the Mannes College of Music and Queens College, City University of New York
 Jonah Kim, cellist, conductor, composer
 Jennifer Koh, violinist
 Paul Kowert, bassist for Punch Brothers
 Lang Lang, pianist
 Mark Lawrence, principal trombonist of the San Francisco Symphony
 Theodore Lettvin, pianist
 Brenda Lewis, soprano
 Ang Li, pianist
 Cecile Licad, pianist
 Marc Lifschey, oboist
 Joan Lippincott, concert organist, former head of the organ department at the Westminster Choir College
 David Ludwig, composer

M–Z

 John Mack, oboist
 Amanda Majeski, soprano Chicago Lyric Opera, Frankfurt Opera, Semperoper
 Virginia MacWatters, soprano
 Robert "Bobby" Martin, pianist, saxophonist, vocalist, most notably with Frank Zappa
 Leon McCawley, pianist
 Jeremy McCoy, current assistant principal bassist with the Metropolitan Opera
 Anthony McGill, principal clarinetist with the Metropolitan Opera
 Gian Carlo Menotti, composer, librettist, and stage director, teacher at the institute
 Frank Miller, cellist
 Anna Moffo, soprano
 Alan Morrison, organist, faculty, Curtis Institute of Music, Westminster Choir College
 Lorne Munroe, cellist, former principal of the New York Philharmonic and the Philadelphia Orchestra
 Christina Naughton, pianist
 Michelle Naughton, pianist
 Erik Nielsen, conductor Frankfurt Opera, Metropolitan Opera, Rome Opera, Semperoper
 Nokuthula Ngwenyama, solo violist, Indiana University faculty
 Lambert Orkis, pianist, Temple University faculty
 Sean Osborn, clarinet soloist, formerly with the Metropolitan Opera
 Eric Owens, bass-baritone
 Rob Patterson, Clarinet, University of Virginia, Lyrique-en-Mer, VERGE Ensemble
 Janet Perry, soprano
 Vincent Persichetti, composer
 Eytan Pessen, accompanist and opera director.
 Richard Purvis, composer and organist, Grace Cathedral, San Francisco
 André Raphel, conductor of the Wheeling Symphony Orchestra
 Gianna Rolandi, soprano, director of the Lyric Opera of Chicago's Ryan Opera Center
 Ned Rorem, composer, pianist, and writer
 Aaron Rosand, violinist
 Leonard Rose, cellist and teacher at the Curtis Institute of Music and the Juilliard School
 Matthew Rose, bass vocalist
 Nino Rota, composer and film composer
 Nadja Salerno-Sonnenberg, violinist
 Andre-Michel Schub, pianist
 Kathryn Selby, pianist
 Peter Serkin, pianist and Director of the Curtis Institute
 Rinat Shaham, mezzo-soprano
 David Shifrin, clarinet soloist, professor at the Yale School of Music
 Benjamin Shwartz, conductor
 Jacques Singer, conductor
 Muriel Smith, mezzo-soprano
 Ignat Solzhenitsyn, former music director of the Chamber Orchestra of Philadelphia
 Josef Špaček, violinist, concertmaster of the Czech Philharmonic and renowned soloist
 Robert Spano, conductor of the Atlanta Symphony Orchestra
 Leslie Spotz, pianist
 Susan Starr, pianist
 Benjamin Steinberg, violinist and conductor
 Arnold Steinhardt, violinist
 Michael Stern, music director and lead conductor of the Kansas City Symphony
 Mimi Stillman, flutist
 Laila Storch oboist, Marcel Tabuteau's biographer
 Jennifer Stumm, violist
 Kay Swift, composer
 Henri Temianka, violinist, conductor
 Michael Tree (née Applebaum), violist, violinist, founding member of the Guarneri Quartet
 Yu-Chien Tseng, violinist
 Benita Valente, soprano
 Yuja Wang, pianist
 Wendy Warner, cellist
 Peter Wiley, cellist with Beaux Arts Trio and Guarneri Quartet, Curtis faculty 
 Haochen Zhang, pianist, Gold Medalist/First Prize winner of the 2009 Thirteenth Van Cliburn International Piano Competition

Faculty and administrators

Past directors
Past directors of the institute have included:
 Josef Hofmann (1926–38) – pianist
 Randall Thompson (1938–40) – composer
 Efrem Zimbalist (1941–68) – violinist
 Rudolf Serkin (1968–76) – pianist
 John de Lancie (1977–85) – principal oboist of the Philadelphia Orchestra for many years
 Gary Graffman (1986–2006) – pianist, continues on the piano faculty

Current administrators
Roberto Díaz is president and director of the institute. Díaz is also a Curtis alumnus and faculty member. He was principal violist of the Philadelphia Orchestra from 1996 to 2006 and is a member of the Diaz Trio.

References

External links
 
 

 
1924 establishments in Pennsylvania
Educational institutions established in 1924
Music schools in Pennsylvania
Universities and colleges in Philadelphia
Rittenhouse Square, Philadelphia
Private universities and colleges in Pennsylvania